Micronesian Myiagra may refer to:

 Guam flycatcher, an extinct species of bird formerly endemic to Guam
 Oceanic flycatcher, a species of bird found on the Caroline Islands

Birds by common name